Andreas Kyriakou (born 5 February 1994) is a Cypriot footballer who plays for Enosis Neon Paralimni as a defender.

External links

1994 births
Living people
Cypriot footballers
Cyprus under-21 international footballers
Cyprus youth international footballers
AEL Limassol players
Aris Limassol FC players
Association football defenders
Sportspeople from Limassol